The Sheriff of County Dublin (or (High) Sheriff of the County of Dublin) was the Sovereign's judicial representative in County Dublin. Initially, an office for a lifetime, assigned by the Sovereign, the Sheriff became an annual appointment following the Provisions of Oxford in 1258. The first recorded Sheriff was Ralph Eure, appointed in that year. The next recorded Sheriff was  Sir David de Offington, who was Sheriff in 1282. Besides his judicial importance, the sheriff had ceremonial and administrative functions and executed High Court Writs.

The first Shrievalties were established before the Norman Conquest of England in 1066 and date back to Saxon times. In 1908, an Order in Council made the Lord-Lieutenant the Sovereign's prime representative in a county and reduced the Sheriff's precedence. Despite however that the holder of the office retained his responsibilities for the preservation of law and order in a county.

Sheriffs of County Dublin
1258: Ralph Eure
1280: David de Callan 
1282: Sir  David de Offington
1299: Rythery Fitzjohn 
1343: Adam  Talbot 
1407: Walter Tyrrell 
1409: Walter Tyrrell (second term)
1423: John Talbot 
1425: Walter  Tyrrell (third term)
1426: Robert de Holywood of Artane 
1456: Robert St Lawrence, 3rd Baron Howth
1465: James Blakeney 
1556: James Luttrell
1560: Sir Christopher Barnewall
1565: Christopher Fagan
1569: Robert Bice
1575: Richard Fagan
1609  Sir Thomas FitzWilliam
1618 Thomas Orpie
1639: Philip Hore 
1642: Robert  Bysse
1655: William Coddington
1655: Sir Daniel Bellingham, 1st Baronet
1684: Sir Richard Bellingham, 2nd Baronet
1691: John Allen, 1st Viscount Allen
1695: Dixie Coddington
1710: Richard Bolton of Brazeel
1713: Clement Barry
1716: Richard Bolton of Brazeel
1721: John Falkiner
1723: Edward Bolton 
1726: Richard Essington of Clonee, Co. Meath, and Tubber, Co. Dublin 
1733: William Ussher
1743: Mark Synott
1746: John Gore Booth
1755: Edward Maunsell
1760: Sir Simon Bradstreet, 2nd Baronet
1762: Sir Henry Echlin, 3rd Baronet
1763: Sir Edward Newenham
1773: Sir George Ribton, 2nd Baronet
1776: (Sir) Patrick King 
1777: Sir Michael Cromie, 1st Baronet of Stacombrie
1781: Sir John Stuart Hamilton, 1st Baronet of Dunamana
1782: William Fortie, of Fortie's Grove
1783: Somerville Pope Stephens, of Clondalkney
1784: Henry Steevens Reily of Prussia St in the City of Dublin
1785: William Holt of Cramlin
1787: Sir John Traill 
1790: George Talbot, later Sir George Talbot, 3rd Baronet of Chart Park
1794: (Sir) St George O'Kelly

19th century

20th century

References

 
Dublin
History of County Dublin